Palmas may refer to:

Places

Brazil
 Palmas, Tocantins, the capital of the state of Tocantins in Brazil
 Palmas Airport
 Palmas, Paraná, a centenary small city in the south of the state of Paraná in Brazil
 Das Palmas River, Brazil

Elsewhere
 Palmas Arborea, a commune in Sicily, Italy
 Palmas, Sardinia, a place on the island of Sardinia, Italy
 Miangas, a small Indonesian island also known as Palmas
 Island of Palmas Case,  a 1928 territorial dispute between the Netherlands and the United States
 Cape Palmas, a headland on the coast of Liberia
 Palmas, Aveyron, a commune in Aveyron department, France
 Palmas, Cataño, Puerto Rico, a barrio in Cataño, Puerto Rico (U.S.)
 Palmas, Guayama, Puerto Rico, a barrio in Guayama, Puerto Rico (U.S.)
 Palmas, Arroyo, Puerto Rico, a barrio in Arroyo, Puerto Rico (U.S.)
 Palmas, Salinas, Puerto Rico, a barrio in Salinas, Puerto Rico (U.S.)

People
 Gérald de Palmas (born 1967), French singer
 Giorgia Palmas (born 1982), Italian television personality and model
 Laurent de Palmas (born 1977), French footballer

Other uses
 Palmas (album), by Eddie Palmieri (1994)
 Palmas (music) hand clapping which is the basis for improvisation in Flamenco
 Banco Palmas, a bank in Brazil
 Palmas Futebol e Regatas, football team in Palmas, Brazil

See also 
 Las Palmas (disambiguation)
 Palma (disambiguation)